Special or specials may refer to:

Policing
 Specials, Ulster Special Constabulary, the Northern Ireland police force
 Specials, Special Constable, an auxiliary, volunteer, or temporary; police worker or police officer

Literature
 Specials (novel), a novel by Scott Westerfeld
 Specials, the comic book heroes, see Rising Stars (comic)

Film and television
 Special (lighting), a stage light that is used for a single, specific purpose
 Special (film), a 2006 scifi dramedy
 The Specials (2000 film), a comedy film about a group of superheroes
 The Specials (2019 film), a film by Olivier Nakache and Éric Toledano
 Television special, television programming that temporarily replaces scheduled programming
 Special (TV series), a 2019 Netflix Original TV series
 Specials (TV series), a 1991 TV series about British Special Constables
 The Specials (TV series), an internet documentary series about 5 friends with learning disabilities
 "Special" (Lost), an episode of the television series Lost

Music
 The Specials, a British 2 tone and ska revival band

Albums
 Special (Lizzo album) or the title song, 2022
 Special (Vesta Williams album) or the title song, 1991
 The Specials (album), by the Specials, 1979
 The Specials (Shania Twain video), 2001

Songs
 "Special" (song), by Garbage, 1998
 "Special", by 21 Savage from Issa Album, 2017
 "Special", by the Game from The Documentary, 2005
 "Special", by Gucci Mane from Delusions of Grandeur, 2019
 "Special", by Janet Jackson from The Velvet Rope, 1997
 "Special", by the Mekons from I Love Mekons, 1993
 "Special", by Mew from And the Glass Handed Kites, 2005
 "Special", by New Order from Republic, 1993
 "Special", by Six60 from Six60, 2015
 "Special", by Stephen Lynch from A Little Bit Special, 2000
 "Special", by Violent Femmes from The Blind Leading the Naked, 1986
 "Special", by Vitamin C from More, 2001
 "Special", by SZA from SOS, 2022

Computing
 Specials (Unicode block), Unicode codepoints used for special usage
 An escape/extension mechanism in the Device independent file format (DVI)

Other uses
 A special price, a form of discounts and allowances
 A kit car or one-off home built vehicle
 A euphemism for someone with a disability, especially an intellectual disability
 Adcox Special, a biplane built in Portland, Oregon in 1929
 SPECIAL System, the character creation system of the video game Fallout

See also

 
 
 
 Special attack (disambiguation)
 Special forces (disambiguation)